David A. Ottignon is a United States Marine Corps lieutenant general who serves as the Commanding General of II Marine Expeditionary Force since August 18, 2022. He most recently served as the Deputy Commandant for Manpower & Reserve Affairs of the United States Marine Corps. Previously, he was the Director of Manpower Management.

References

|-

|-

|-

Living people
Place of birth missing (living people)
Recipients of the Defense Superior Service Medal
Recipients of the Legion of Merit
United States Marine Corps generals
United States Marine Corps personnel of the Iraq War
Year of birth missing (living people)